Turner Valley Bar N Ranch Airport  was located at Turner Valley Bar N Ranch,  southwest of Turner Valley, Alberta, Canada.

References

External links
Page about this airport on COPA's Places to Fly airport directory

Defunct airports in Alberta
Foothills County